André Félix Rischmann (26 January 1882 in Paris – 9 November 1955 in Paris) was a French rugby union player who competed in the 1900 Summer Olympics. He was a member of the French rugby union team, which won the gold medal.

References

External links

André Rischmann's profile at databaseOlympics

1882 births
1955 deaths
Rugby union players from Paris
French rugby union players
Rugby union players at the 1900 Summer Olympics
Olympic rugby union players of France
Olympic gold medalists for France
Medalists at the 1900 Summer Olympics